Manjak is a village in the municipality of Vladičin Han, Serbia. According to the 2011 census, the village has a population of 375 people.

References

Populated places in Pčinja District